Place du Château d'Eau may refer to:

The former name of the Place de la République
Château d'Eau (Paris Métro)